Mamie Garvin Fields (August 13, 1888 – July 30, 1987) was a teacher, civil rights and religious activist, and memoirist. In 1909, she became one of the first African-American teachers to be hired in a Charleston County, South Carolina, public school. She was also a co-founder of the Modern Priscilla Club of Charleston in 1927.

Early life
Mamie Elizabeth Garvin was born in Charleston, South Carolina, on August 13, 1888. She was the daughter of George Washington Garvin and Rebecca Mary Logan Bellinger. She attended school at Shaw, and then Claflin College. She received a licensure to teach and a diploma in science. She wanted to be a missionary but her parents wanted her to teach.

After college
She began her teaching career in 1908 at Pine Wood, which was a predominantly black school at the time. On her return to Charleston in 1909, she became one of the first African-American teachers to be hired in a Charleston County public school. She later became principal of the Miller High School in Johns Island for two years.

After living in Boston for a few years, she returned to Charleston and married Robert Lucas Fields. The couple had two sons, Alfred Benjamin and Robert Lionel. In 1926, Fields returned to teaching at the Society Corner School. During the Depression, she founded the first vacation bible school for migrant workers in Charleston. Fields retired from teaching in 1943.

Activist
In 1916, Fields joined the City of Charleston Federation of Colored Woman's Club. She cofounded the Modern Priscilla Club of Charleston in 1927. After retirement, Fields still remained active in women's clubs, and also volunteering in many civic and religious organizations. She was a member of the National Association of Colored Women's Clubs, whose mission was to “Lift as they Climb” through charitable, civic and other activities. She served as president of the South Carolina Federation of Colored Women's Clubs through 1958 to 1964 and was the superintendent of the Marion Birnie Wilkinson Home for Girls in Cayce, South Carolina.

Awards and recognition
Fields won awards from several organizations, including women's groups and black sororities. She won the award for the state's Outstanding Older Citizen from the South Carolina Commission on Aging.

Nearing her ninetieth birthday, she began working with her granddaughter, Karen Fields, on her memoir,  Lemon Swamp and Other Places (1983). The memoir covers her life and work in South Carolina from 1888 to the present.

Fields died in Charleston on July 30, 1987.

References

1888 births
1987 deaths
Writers from Charleston, South Carolina
Claflin University alumni
Schoolteachers from South Carolina
Activists from South Carolina
American women educators
American civil rights activists
African-American activists
African-American schoolteachers
Place of death missing
20th-century American memoirists
American women memoirists
People from Charleston, South Carolina
20th-century African-American women writers
20th-century American women writers
20th-century African-American writers
19th-century American women
Women civil rights activists
19th-century African-American women